Bystrowice  (Bystrovychi) is a village in the administrative district of Gmina Roźwienica, within Jarosław County, Subcarpathian Voivodeship, in south-eastern Poland.

The village has a population of 550.

References

Bystrowice